United Church of Huntington is a historic church in Wellington, Ohio.

Description and history
It was one of three churches in Huntington, Ohio at the time it was built in 1847. Originally a Methodist church it is now the United Church serving the reduced need for churches in the town. It is an example of Greek Revival architecture. It was added to the National Register of Historic Places on June 15, 1979, as a part of the Wellington–Huntington Road multiple resource area.

See also
 Historic preservation
 National Register of Historic Places in Lorain County, Ohio

References

External links
 
 

Churches on the National Register of Historic Places in Ohio
Greek Revival church buildings in Ohio
Churches completed in 1847
Churches in Lorain County, Ohio
National Register of Historic Places in Lorain County, Ohio
1847 establishments in Ohio
Wellington, Ohio